A microprotein (miP) is a small protein encoded from small open reading frames (smORFs). They are a class of protein with a single protein domain that are related to multidomain proteins. Microproteins regulate larger multidomain proteins at the post-translational level. Microproteins are analogous to microRNAs (miRNAs) and heterodimerize with their targets causing dominant and negative effects.  In animals and plants, microproteins have been found to greatly influence biological processes. Because of microproteins' dominant effects on their targets, microproteins are currently being studied for potential applications in biotechnology.

History 
The first microprotein (miP) discovered was during a research in the early 1990s on genes for basic helix–loop–helix (bHLH) transcription factors from a murine erythroleukaemia cell cDNA library. The protein was found to be an inhibitor of DNA binding (ID protein), and it negatively regulated the transcription factor complex. The ID protein was 16 kDa and consisted of a helix-loop-helix (HLH) domain. The microprotein formed bHLH/HLH heterodimers which disrupted the functional basic helix–loop–helix (bHLH) homodimers. 

The first microprotein discovered in plants was the LITTLE ZIPPER (ZPR) protein. The LITTLE ZIPPER protein contains a leucine zipper domain but does not have the domains required for DNA binding and transcription activation. Thus, LITTLE ZIPPER protein is analogous to the ID protein. Despite not all proteins being small, in 2011, this class of protein was given the name microproteins because their negative regulatory actions are similar to those of miRNAs. 

Evolutionarily, the ID protein or proteins similar to ID found in all animals. In plants, microproteins are only found in higher order. However, the homeodomain transcription factors that belong to the three-amino-acid loop-extension (TALE) family are targets of microproteins, and these homeodomain proteins are conserved in animals, plants, and fungi.

Structure 
Microproteins are generally small proteins with a single protein domain. The active form of microproteins are translated from smORF.  The smORF codons which microproteins are translated from can be less than 100 codons. However, not all microproteins are small, and the name was given because their actions are analogous to miRNAs.

Function 
The function of microproteins is post-translational regulators. Microproteins disrupt the formation of heterodimeric, homodimeric, or multimeric complexes. Furthermore, microproteins can interact with any protein that require functional dimers to function normally. The primary targets of microproteins are transcription factors that bind to DNA as dimers. Microproteins regulate these complexes by creating homotypic dimers with the targets and inhibit protein complex function.  There are two types of miP inhibitions: homotypic miP inhibition and heterotypic miP inhibition. In homotypic miP inhibition, microproteins interact with proteins with similar protein-protein interaction (PPI) domain. In heterotypic miP inhibition, microproteins interact with proteins with different but compatible PPI domain. In both types of inhibition, microproteins interfere and prevent the PPI domains from interacting with their normal proteins.

References 

Protein classification
Post-translational modification